Parastegophilus is a genus of pencil catfishes native to South America.

Species
There are currently two recognized species in this genus:
 Parastegophilus maculatus (Steindachner, 1879)
 Parastegophilus paulensis (Miranda-Ribeiro, 1918)

P. maculatus originates from the lower Paraná and Uruguay River basins in Argentina while P. paulensis is from the upper Paraná River basin in Brazil. P. maculatus enters the gill chamber of the catfish Luciopimelodus pati and feeds on the gills.

References

Trichomycteridae
Fish of South America
Fish of Argentina
Fauna of Brazil
Freshwater fish genera
Catfish genera